Bertel Geismar Haarder (born 7 September 1944, in Rønshoved, near Aabenraa) is a Danish writer, teacher and politician, who was a member of the Folketing for the Venstre political party. He has served as minister several times, including Minister of Education from 1982 to 1993 and again in 2005 to 2010, and most recently as Minister for Culture and Ecclesiastical Affairs from 2015 to 2016 in the L. L. Rasmussen II Cabinet. He is a former member of European Parliament, serving from 1994 to 2001. He has also served as president of Nordic Council on two occasions, first in 2011 and latest from 2020 to 2021.

Political career
Haarder was first elected to the Folketing (Parliament) in 1975. Until 1977 he was a member of the Folketing representing North Jutland County constituency, and from 1977 to 1999 he was a member of the Folketing from Copenhagen County constituency. From 2005 to 2007, he was a member from Vestsjælland County constituency, and since 2007 he has been a member from Greater Copenhagen constituency. He was also a Member of the European Parliament from 1994 to 2001, and he served as Vice-Chairman of the European Parliament from 1997 to 1999.

From 10 September 1982 to 25 January 1993 he was Education Minister in various cabinets of Poul Schlüter. From 10 September 1987 to 25 January 1993 he was also the Minister of Research.

From November 2001 to February 2005 he was Minister for Refugees, Immigrants and Integration in the Cabinet of Anders Fogh Rasmussen I, and enacted a policy of tough measures designed to limit the number of immigrants coming to Denmark. From February 2005 until February 2010 Haarder was once more the Education Minister in the Cabinet of Anders Fogh Rasmussen II. From February 2010 to October 2011 he was Interior and Health Minister in the Lars Løkke Rasmussen I Cabinet

Furthermore, from February 2005 to November 2007 he was minister for Ecclesiastical Affairs and from November 2007 until February 2010 the Minister of Nordic Cooperation in the Cabinet of Anders Fogh Rasmussen III. In February 2010 the veteran minister took over as Interior and Health Minister until October 2011. He is the longest serving Danish minister.

In 2021 Haarder announced he would not be standing at the 2022 Danish general election and subsequently lost his seat in the Folketing.

Personal life
Haarder was born 7 September 1944 on Rønshoved højskole, son of Hans Haarder and Agnete Haarder. He graduated in Political Science from Aarhus University in 1970. From 1968 to 1973 he worked as a teacher on Askov Højskole. From 1971 to 1973 he worked as a teacher at Haderslev State Teacher Training College. From 1973 to 1975 he worked as a lecturer at Aalborg Teacher Training College.

Bibliography
Statskollektivisme og Spildproduktion (1973)
Institutionernes Tyranni (1974)
Den organiserede arbejdsløshed (1975)
Danskerne år 2002 (1977)
Midt i en klynketid (1980)
Kampen om gymnasiet (1982, co-author)
Ny-liberalismen – og dens rødder (1982, co-author)
Grænser for politik (1990)
Slip friheden løs (1990)
Lille land, hvad nu? (1994)
Den bløde kynisme (1997)
Op mod strømmen - med højskolen i ryggen (2012)
Bertels bedste - sange og fortællinger fra Borgen (2018)

Honours and decorations 
  Order of Merit of the Federal Republic of Germany, Grand Cross 1st Class
  Order of St. Olav, Grand Cross
  Order of the Polar Star, Commander 1st Class
  Order of the Falcon, Grand Cross
  Order of the Dannebrog, Grand Cross
  Grand Decoration of Honour in Gold with Star
  Order of the White Rose of Finland

External links 

 Biography on the website of the Danish Parliament (Folketinget)

References

1944 births
Living people
People from Aabenraa Municipality
Government ministers of Denmark
Danish Interior Ministers
Danish Ministers for Ecclesiastical Affairs
Danish Health Ministers
Education ministers of Denmark
Aarhus University alumni
Danish writers
Danish educators
Venstre (Denmark) politicians
Venstre (Denmark) MEPs
MEPs for Denmark 1994–1999
MEPs for Denmark 1999–2004
Knights of the Order of the Dannebrog
Grand Crosses 1st class of the Order of Merit of the Federal Republic of Germany
Recipients of the Decoration for Services to the Republic of Austria
Recipients of the Order of the Falcon
Commanders First Class of the Order of the Polar Star
Members of the Folketing 1975–1977
Members of the Folketing 1977–1979
Members of the Folketing 1979–1981
Members of the Folketing 1981–1984
Members of the Folketing 1984–1987
Members of the Folketing 1987–1988
Members of the Folketing 1988–1990
Members of the Folketing 1990–1994
Members of the Folketing 1994–1998
Members of the Folketing 1998–2001
Members of the Folketing 2005–2007
Members of the Folketing 2007–2011
Members of the Folketing 2011–2015
Members of the Folketing 2015–2019
Members of the Folketing 2019–2022